Ampelita julii is a species of tropical air-breathing land snail, a terrestrial pulmonate gastropod mollusk in the family Acavidae. This species is endemic to Madagascar.

Subspecies 
 Ampelita julii soa Emberton & Griffiths, 2009

References

Acavidae
Gastropods described in 1965
Taxonomy articles created by Polbot
Endemic fauna of Madagascar